The 1989 Winter Universiade, the XIV Winter Universiade, took place in Sofia, Bulgaria.

Medal table

References

1989
U
U
U
Multi-sport events in Bulgaria
1980s in Sofia
Sports competitions in Sofia
March 1989 sports events in Europe
Winter sports competitions in Bulgaria